Whishaw is a surname. Notable people with the surname include:

Ben Whishaw (born 1980), English actor
Anthony Whishaw (born 1930), English artist
Francis Whishaw (1804–1856), English civil engineer
Fred Whishaw (1854–1934), Russian-born British writer
Stella Zoe Whishaw, original name of Stella Arbenina (1885–1976), Russian-born English actress

See also
Wishaw